Jack Billy James Moore-Billam (born 3 February 2004) is an English professional footballer who plays as a midfielder for Cleethorpes Town on loan from National League club Scunthorpe United.

Playing career
Born in Sheffield, Moore-Billam made his senior debut for Scunthorpe United in the EFL Trophy coming on as a substitute in a 3-0 defeat to Manchester City U23s on 24 August 2021. In EFL League Two, he made his first professional start on 18 April 2022 in a 1–1 draw against Stevenage. Alongside fellow youth team graduate Ethan Young, Moore-Billam signed his first professional contract with Scunthorpe on 22 April 2022.

On 11 August 2022, Moore-Billam joined Northern Premier League Division One East club Cleethorpes Town on a one-month loan deal. He scored in his second appearance in a 4–2 victory over Tadcaster Albion. Moore-Billam returned to the club for a further one-month loan deal in October 2022. The loan deal was later extended.

Career statistics

References

External links

2004 births
Living people
English footballers
Footballers from Sheffield
Association football midfielders
Scunthorpe United F.C. players
Cleethorpes Town F.C. players
English Football League players